The Bell of Sangwonsa is a bronze bell designated as National Treasures of South Korea #36. It is located in the Sangwonsa temple in Pyeongchang County, Gangwon Province.

See also
 Culture of Korea
 Korean Art
 Bell of King Seongdeok
 Bell of Yongjusa
 Bell of Cheonheungsa

References

Individual bells
Korean art
National Treasures of South Korea